PEN/Jean Stein Book Award is awarded by the PEN America to honor a "a book-length work of any genre for its originality, merit, and impact". With an award of $75,000 it is one of the richest prizes given by the PEN American Center. It was first awarded in 2017.

The award is one of many PEN awards sponsored by International PEN affiliates in over 145 PEN centers around the world. The PEN American Center awards have been characterized as being among the "major" American literary prizes.

Winners and finalists

References

External links
PEN America
PEN/Jean Stein Book Award

PEN America awards
Awards established in 2017
2017 establishments in the United States
American fiction awards
American poetry awards
American non-fiction literary awards
English-language literary awards